HMS Alarm was a torpedo gunboat of the British Royal Navy and the name ship of her class. Alarm was built by Sheerness Dockyard from 1891–1894. She was sold for scrap in 1907.

Design and construction
The Alarms were slightly modified  versions of the previous Sharpshooter-class, with modified engines to improve reliability.

Two triple-expansion steam engines, fed by four locomotive boilers, drove two propeller shafts.

The ship was armed with two 4.7 inch (120 mm) QF guns mounted fore and aft on the ships centreline, backed up by four 3-pounder (47 mm) guns (two in single mounts on the ship's beam and two in casemates forward) and a single Gardner machine gun. Five 14-inch torpedo tubes were fitted (one fixed in the ship's bow and two twin mounts), with three reload torpedoes carried. The ship had a crew of 91.

Alarm was laid down at Sheerness Dockyard on 25 June 1891 and launched on 13 September 1892. Alarm reached a speed of  during sea trials. She was completed in March 1894 at a cost of £59,346.

Service
Alarm was commissioned into the Medway Fleet Reserve, based at Chatham on 30 March 1894. In August 1894 Alarm took part in that year's Naval Manoeuvres. In July–August 1895, Alarm again took part in the annual Naval Manoeuvres, supporting the Channel Fleet and returning to reserve on completion of the exercises. She took part in the 1896 Manoeuvres in July–August that year, operating out of Dublin Bay.

On 22 February 1898, Alarm visited Wells-next-the-Sea to deliver stores to the coastguard station. Alarm signalled her presence by the ship's whistle, and the coastguards despatched a boat to pick up the stores, despite a heavy sea inshore due to high winds from the North. When this did not arrive, Alarm, whose Master was not aware of the treacherous conditions close to shore, launched a gig to deliver the stores, but later that day, search parties from the coastguard station found both boats capsized. All five men aboard the coastguard boat and six men aboard Alarms boat were killed. On 15 June 1899, Alarm dispersed a number of French fishing boats from Boulogne which were operating in Folkestone Bay, within British waters, with one of the French boats later arrested and her master fined, with the boats catch and fishing gear confiscated.

Alarm took part in the 1900 Naval Manoeuvres in July that year, and was judged by the umpires to have been captured, along with sister ship  by the opposing force. Torpedo gunboats including Alarm were criticised in reports of the manoeuvres for not making their nominal speeds, and being unsuitable for use against torpedo boats or destroyers.

Alarm had been stricken from the effective list by 1905, being described in Parliament as being "of comparatively small fighting value", although her armament was not removed. Torpedo gunboats that had been re-boilered and re-engined were considered still effective and retained in service, but it was not felt worthwhile to re-engine the remaining torpedo gunboats, such as Alarm. Alarm was sold for scrap to the Thames Shipbuilding Company on 9 April 1907.

References

Bibliography 

 
 
 

Alarm-class torpedo gunboats
Ships built in Sheerness
1892 ships